Defensin, alpha 1B a human protein that is encoded by the DEFA1B gene.

See also 
 defensin

References

Further reading

External links 
 PDBe-KB provides an overview of all the structure information available in the PDB for Human Neutrophil defensin 1 (DEFA1B)

Defensins